The Jakarta metropolitan area or Greater Jakarta, known locally as Jabodetabek (an acronym of Jakarta–Bogor–Depok–Tangerang–Bekasi), and sometimes extended to Jabodetabekjur (with the acronym extended to include part of Cianjur Regency), or Jabodetabekpunjur (further extended to include Puncak and the Cipanas district), is the most populous metropolitan area in Indonesia. It includes the national capital (Jakarta Special Capital Region, as the core city) as well as five satellite cities and three complete regencies. The original term "Jabotabek" dated from the late 1970s and was revised to "Jabodetabek" in 1999 when "De" (for "Depok") was inserted into the name following its formation. The term "Jabodetabekjur" or "Jabodetabekpunjur" was legalised on the Presidential Regulation Number 54 of 2008, although the name Jabodetabek is more commonly used.

The area comprises Jakarta Special Capital Region and parts of West Java and Banten provinces, specifically the three regencies - Bekasi Regency and Bogor Regency in West Java, and Tangerang Regency in Banten. The area also includes the independent cities of Bogor, Depok, Bekasi, Tangerang and South Tangerang, all of which are not included administratively in the regencies. The name of the region is taken from the first two (or three) letters of each city's name: Ja-bo-de-ta-bek from Jakarta, Bogor, Depok, Tangerang and Bekasi.

The Jakarta metropolitan area's share of the national population increased from 6.1% in 1961 to 11.26% in 2010. The population grew further to 31.53 million according to the official mid 2021 Estimates.

The region is the centre of government, culture, education, and economy of Indonesia. It has pulled many people from throughout Indonesia to come, live and work. Its economic power makes Jakarta metropolitan area the country's premier centre for finance, manufacturing and commerce. In 2019 data,
The area has a gross domestic product of US$297.7 billion with a per capita GDP of $8,775, and a purchasing power parity of US$978.5 billion with a per capita PPP of $28,840, equal to 26.2% of economy of Indonesia.

The region was established in 1976 through Presidential Instruction No. 13 in response to the needs to sustain the growing population of the capital city. Indonesia's government established the Jabotabek Cooperation Body (Badan Kerjasama Pembangunan) of the joint secretariat of Government of DKI Jakarta and West Java province.

Greater Jakarta

The generic term Greater Jakarta refers to the urban region surrounding Jakarta, and it is not specific to any official or administrative designations. On the contrary, depending on context, it may refer to the built-up area around Jakarta.

Demographics
Among the inhabitants, approximately 10.61 million lived in Jakarta Special Capital Region according to the mid 2021 official estimates; about 8.98 million in the five cities of Bogor, Depok, Bekasi, Tangerang and South Tangerang; and about 11.94 million in the three regencies (Bekasi Regency, Bogor Regency, and Tangerang Regency. The proportion of core city (Jakarta) population to the total population of the metropolitan area also declined significantly. In 2020, the population of Jakarta was only 30.4% of the total population of the Jakarta metropolitan area, continuing the trend of decline from 54.6% in 1990 to 43.2% in 2000 and to 35.5% in 2010. Furthermore, there has been a shift of arrival-destination for incoming migrants, from Jakarta city to other cities in the Jakarta metropolitan area. Today, about 20% of Indonesia's urban population is concentrated in the Jakarta metropolitan area.

Sources: 
 Census final 2010; Census final 2020 / Badan Pusat Statistik - Indonesia.
 Indonesia: Table of all administrative divisions/ Citypopulation.de
 Kemendagri 2022 June estimate.  Note the pandemic had skewing effects on Census 2020 data compared with prior year estimates, in favor of satellite cities, while post-pandemic data indicates a flood back into central cities.  This effect is repeated for Bandung, Surabaya, Palembang, and Medan.

Economy
 
Nowadays, the role of the Jakarta metropolitan area in the national economy is still dominant although the decentralisation policy has been implemented since the political reforms in 1998. The region accounts for 25.52% of total national gross domestic product and 42.8% to the total GDP of Java in 2010. Central Jakarta, South Jakarta and Bekasi have respectively accounted for 4.14%; 3.78% and 2.11% of total national GDP. There are three dominant sectors which have a high contribution to the total Jakarta metropolitan area's GDP comprising: industrial sector (28.36%), financial sector (20.66%) as well as trade, hotel and restaurant sectors (20.24%). Based on the contribution of each sector to the total national GDP in 2010, Jakarta metropolitan area contributed 41.87% for the finance sector, 33.1% for construction and building, as well as 30.86% for transportation.

Prime business and commercial centres include the "Golden Triangle" in central Jakarta. There are Indonesia's premier financial centre, SCBD, Mega Kuningan, Rasuna Epicentrum as well as along Jalan Jenderal Sudirman, Jalan M.H. Thamrin, Jalan Jenderal Gatot Subroto and Jalan HR Rasuna Said. The Golden Triangle is also known to expatriates and locals as a lifestyle centre of the metropolis. There are countless high-end boutiques, fine restaurants, coffee shops and malls. Kelapa Gading is the newest business district, lifestyle centre and residential areas, located in the north-eastern part of Jakarta. It has several bars and entertainment places that open up until late at night.

The development of large scale residential areas and industrial parks in the Jakarta metropolitan area has been induced by infrastructure development, especially toll roads and railways. The Jakarta metropolitan area has been built industrial estate in the outskirts, mainly in Cikarang, home to a dozen industrial estates with more than 2,500 industrial companies. The Cikarang industrial estate occupied a total land area of about 11,000 hectares and became the largest concentration of manufacturing activities in Southeast Asia. Many foreign companies are located in the Cikarang industrial estate, such as from Japan, South Korea, China, Singapore and United States.

Transportation

The region is partly defined by the areas from which people commute into the city. All municipality and regencies have access to toll road and rail service. At present public transport in Greater Jakarta consists of TransJakarta BRT, KRL Commuterline commuter rail, Jakarta LRT, Soekarno-Hatta Airport Rail Link, and Jakarta MRT. The transit system that is currently under construction is LRT Jabodebek. Jakarta LRT began operation by late 2019, and LRT Jabodebek is expected to open by March 2021.

Air

The Jakarta metropolitan area has two major airports, Soekarno Hatta International Airport, commonly known as Cengkareng Airport (CGK) and Halim Perdanakusuma International Airport (chiefly domestic). Pondok Cabe Airport in South Tangerang, owned by the state oil company Pertamina, is used for civilian and military airport.

Rail

The Jakarta metropolitan area is served by KRL Commuterline, a 418 km (260 mi) commuter train comprising five lines (Red/Bogor Line, Green/Rangkasbitung Line, Blue/Cikarang Loop Line, Brown/Tangerang Line and Pink/Tanjung Priok Line) and over 80 stations across the area, plus Lebak Regency in Banten.

Urban rail systems in Jakarta include rapid transit system Jakarta MRT, and light rail system Jakarta LRT, and Greater Jakarta LRT. Before Jakarta MRT was opened in 2019, the Jakarta metropolitan area was the world's largest metropolitan areas without a grade-separated rapid transit system.

Rail connection to Soekarno-Hatta International Airport is served by Soekarno-Hatta Airport Rail Link and Soekarno–Hatta Airport Skytrain inside the airport complex.

Bus

The TransJakarta bus rapid transit service (known as Busway) was developed throughout Jakarta and currently has 13 active corridors and a further three in planning. The system connects Bekasi, Depok, and Tangerang with three routes connecting Jakarta with Bekasi vice versa, namely Harapan Indah - Pasar Baru, West Bekasi - Bunderan HI, and East Bekasi - Tanjung Priok. While for Depok, only three routes are currently active: UI - Manggarai, UI - Lebak bulus, Terminal Depok - BKN via the Cijago toll road. In addition to the main corridors, the feeder buses of Transjakarta serves commuters from satellite cities, such as Bumi Serpong Damai and Bintaro Jaya (South Tangerang) as well as Kemang Pratama, Grand Galaxy City and Cibubur (Bekasi).

See also

List of metropolitan areas by population

References

Further reading
 Forbes, Dean. "Jakarta: Globalization, economic crisis, and social change," pp. 268–298, in Josef Gugler (ed.) World Cities beyond the West: Globalization, Development and Inequality.

Metropolitan areas of Indonesia
Areas of Jakarta